Bane Park is a park located in Brainerd, Minnesota, United States. It has a hockey rink, open rink, warming house, playground and baseball fields. From 1933 to 1935, it served as the home ballpark for three minor league baseball teams: the Brainerd Muskies (1933), the Brainerd-Little Falls Muskies (1934) and the Brainerd Blues (1935). They all played in the Northern League.

The baseball fields are currently used by Bronco and PONY league players.

References

Sports venues in Minnesota
Ice hockey venues in Minnesota
Buildings and structures in Crow Wing County, Minnesota
Tourist attractions in Crow Wing County, Minnesota